Bryukhovetsky District is an administrative district (raion), one of the thirty-eight in Krasnodar Krai, Russia. As a municipal division, it is incorporated as the Bryukhovetsky Municipal District. It is located in the northern central part of the krai. Its administrative center is the rural locality (a stanitsa) of Bryukhovetskaya. Population:  The population of Bryukhovetskaya accounts for 41.7% of the district's total population.

References

Notes

Sources

Districts of Krasnodar Krai